Birds Do It is a 1966 comedy film directed by Andrew Marton and starring Soupy Sales, Tab Hunter, Arthur O'Connell, Edward Andrews and Beverly Adams. It was made by Columbia Pictures and filmed at the Ivan Tors Studios in Miami.

Plot
The film opens with a series of unsuccessful assassination attempts by an unknown organisation with their target being Melvin Byrd. Byrd is a janitor in a NASA laboratory headed by Major General Smithburn with his security officer being an inept bungler, Lt. Porter. Porter is captured and impersonated by an enemy double from the same organization attempting to kill Byrd.

The head scientist Professor Waid has employed Byrd due to his excellent janitorial skills as Waid blames American space program failures on dust that caused disasters. Byrd parodies the Ajax "stronger than dirt" white knight commercial when cleaning the base.

Waid's secret project is developing an ionisation process initially to be tested on a chimpanzee that would make the subject capable of anti-gravity with a side effect that not only gives him the ability to fly, but makes him "the most attractive man" on Earth. When General Smithburn leads a Congressional delegation who are in Florida due to European junkets being cancelled, Byrd hides in the ionization machine, causing him to be ionized. In addition to losing the ability to stay on the ground for longer than brief periods, Byrd finds himself forced to fight off the attentions of a Congresswoman and Waid's daughter Claudine as well as the assassins.

Cast
 Soupy Sales as Melvin Byrd
 Tab Hunter as Lt. Porter
 Arthur O'Connell as Prof. Wald
 Edward Andrews as Gen. Smithburn
 Doris Dowling as Congresswoman Clanger
 Beverly Adams as Claudine Wald
 Louis Quinn as Sgt. Shan
 Warren Day as Curtis

Production
Producer Ivan Tors filmed Birds Do It at his Miami studios with cameos provided by Dean Martin (Columbia's Matt Helm), Flipper, director Andrew Marton as himself, and a Cary Grant impersonator played by Ray Anthony.

Sales was vocal in his dislike for the film, his only starring role. It was also the next-to-last film in Marton's long directing career.

The special effects of Byrd flying are in the style of the Hertz Rent-A-Car commercials of the time. One sequence featured Byrd being attacked by skydivers in a sequence reminiscent of the pre-credits sequence of Moonraker with Byrd's stunt double wearing a parachute under his sport coat.

See also
 List of American films of 1966

Notes

External links
 

1966 films
1966 comedy films
American comedy films
Columbia Pictures films
Films set in Florida
Films shot in Florida
Films directed by Andrew Marton
1960s English-language films
1960s American films